In the Rude! is the third live album by The Basics. It was released on 21 May 2017. The release date coincides with band member Wally De Backer's 37th birthday. The album commemorates the band's 15-year anniversary since their formation in 2002.

In the Rude! was recorded live at The Howler in Brunswick, Melbourne on 29 December 2016.

Two versions of the album artwork have been released, each with a different colour theme and containing different photographs taken by Melbourne photographer Barry C. Douglas.

The track "With This Ship" was released as a single prior to the release of the album. It was accompanied by a live music video recorded by Barry C. Douglas at the concert from which the album is recorded at, with animated overlay from the original 2009 studio film clip by Matt Arnold.

The second single from the album, "Bitten by the Same Bug", was released on 16 May 2017. It was accompanied by a music video clip filmed and directed by Barry C. Douglas, and starring Michael Bennetto with live footage excerpts from the Howler gig.

Track listing

Charts

References

External links

White CD edition
Black CD edition
Digital edition

2017 live albums
The Basics live albums